Roşioara may refer to several villages in Romania:

 Roşioara, a village in the town of Berbești, Vâlcea County
 Roşioara, a village in Mera, Vrancea County

See also 
 Roșu (disambiguation)
 Roșia (disambiguation)
 Roșieni (disambiguation)
 Roșiori (disambiguation)